Rahim Kandi (also Romanized as Raḥīm Kandī) is a village in Qeshlaq-e Shomali Rural District, in the Central District of Parsabad County, Ardabil Province, Iran. At the 2006 census, its population was 73, in 18 families.

References 

Towns and villages in Parsabad County